Jāņi cheese is a Latvian sour milk cheese, traditionally eaten on Jāņi, the Latvian celebration of the summer solstice. Nowadays the cheese has become one of the symbols of Latvian culture.

In 2021, it was reported that Jāņi cheese was losing its popularity due to the COVID-19 pandemic and consumers opting out for other types of cheeses, such as mozzarella, feta, as well as hard cheese, and aged cheeses.

Production 

The basic ingredients of the dish are curd produced from both soured milk and fresh milk. Traditionally, caraway seeds, salt and eggs are added during cooking, as well as butter or cream if wishing to increase fat content. The cheese is made by heating whole milk, adding curd, and then cooking the mixture until fluffy curds separate from a clear whey. At this point, the curds are placed into a skillet or cooking pan, and a mixture of egg, butter, salt, and caraway seeds is stirred into it. Once a solid and firm ball is formed, the cheese is placed in a  cheesecloth to drain and often pressed by placing weight on it. Generally, the cheese is prepared a few days before eating and is allowed to ripen in a cool place before consumption.

Certification 

On November 16, 2015, Jāņi cheese was included in the EU Traditional Speciality Guaranteed (TSG) register under the name Jāņu siers. Currently 5 manufacturers ("Valmieras piens", "Rankas piens", "Lazdonas piensaimnieks", "Straupe", and "Dundaga") fulfil the TSG criteria and can label their product as Jāņu siers.

References

External links
 Jāņi cheese Traditional Speciality Guaranteed specification . Official Journal of the European Union
 Uldis Birziņš (June 19, 2020) Latvian mozzarella recipe for Midsummer. Public Broadcasting of Latvia.

Acid-set cheeses
Latvian cuisine
Traditional Speciality Guaranteed products from Latvia